The Zibar is a family of light, four-wheel drive, military trucks and utility vehicles designed and produced by Israeli racer and fabricator Ido Cohen in 1998. Cohen designed and manufactured the chassis and frame while utilizing commercial off-the shelf parts such as General Motors crate LS3 383 cid/6.2L 400 hp V8 engines (current engine is the LQ4 GM 6L 430 hp (320 kW) @ 5900 rpm V8,) General Motors 4L80E transmission, Atlas II transfer cases and General Motors Dynatrac 60 axles. The current manufacturer is Ido OffRoad Center Ltd (IORC).

Variants
 Z-COM – a stripped down four seat side-by-side UTV
 Zibar Mk.1 – the initial variant, now out of production,
 Zibar Mk. 2 – the current civil version
 Zibar M – the military variant
 Z- Mag – lightened open prototype 
 Zibar Trooper – Hardtop two or four door pickup truck
 Zibar Zed – armored variant

Users
By 2012 there were 40 made-in-Israel Zibars, five of them to the Israeli military and the others to customers in Africa, Russia, Latin America and Abu Dhabi.

See also
 Humvee

References

External links
 Zibar USA official page
 Ido Off Road Center official page

All-wheel-drive vehicles
Military vehicles of Israel
Military trucks
Off-road vehicles
Pickup trucks
Military light utility vehicles
Full-size sport utility vehicles
Defense companies of Israel